A with diaeresis (Ӓ ӓ; italics: Ӓ ӓ) is a letter of the Cyrillic script. In all its forms it looks exactly like the Latin letter A with diaeresis (Ä ä Ä ä).

It is used in the Khanty, Kildin Sami, and Hill Mari languages. Also, this letter was once used in the Gagauz language (which was substituted with ).

This letter also appears in Serbian in some of its dialects.

Usage

In Hill Mari and Gagauz this letter represents the near-open front unrounded vowel, .

In Khanty this letter represents the near-open central vowel .

A with diaeresis is used in some South Slavic languages, mainly in the Serbian language to be used for easily shifting the accents in the above languages not only in declensions but elsewhere: брӓт.

Computing codes

See also
A a : Latin letter A
Ä ä : Latin letter A with diaeresis - an Estonian, Finnish, German, Slovak and Swedish letter
А а : Cyrillic A
Cyrillic characters in Unicode

References

Cyrillic letters with diacritics
Letters with diaeresis